The West is a ten-poem-cycle by Vladimir Mayakovsky written in 1922-1924 after his extensive foreign tour which included visits to Latvia, Italy, Germany, France and the United Kingdom. It was followed in 1925 by an eight-poem cycle Paris, inspired by the impressions from his visit to France. Originally the two cycles were seen as separate collections. Compiling the material for the first edition of The Works by V.V. Mayakovsky the author put them under one heading.

The 1922–1924 poems were published originally in the USSR, mostly by Izvestiya newspaper.

Poems

The West
  (How Does the Democratic Republic Work?). , 23 May 1922. Inspired by Mayakovsky's first foreign trip, to Riga, Latvia, in May 1922.
  (My Speech at the Genoa Conference). , 12 April 1922. 
  (Chain Them!). , 16 January 1923.
  (Germany). , 4 January 1923. 
  (Paris.  Conversations With the Eiffel Tower). , No.9, 1923.
  (How Curzon's Appetites Grew As the Dinner Went On). , 3 June 1923. 
 .  , 20 May 1923. Published on the day of arrival to Moscow of the remnants of the Soviet diplomat Vatslav Vorovsky, assassinated in Lausanne, Switzerland, on 10 May.
  (Movie Craze). Ogonyok, No.8, 1924. Written in summer 1923 after his second trip to Germany, the poem is a response to the great success of the Charlie Chaplin films and the German's audiences' alleged failure to realise that it was Europe that 'Comrade Charlot' (as the actor is here being referred to) makes fun of. 
  (Нордерней). , 12 August 1923. 
  (Already!). , No. 3, 1924.

Paris
Mayakovsky spent November and December 1924 in France. These impressions inspired eight poems written from late 1924 to early 1925. On his way to the USA, in May of that year, he came to the offices of Parizhsky Vestnik and left there five poems with the permission to publish them.
  (Here I Come). , 3 June 1925. Later  magazine, No.12, 1925.
  (The City). , 3 June 1925. , No.12, 1925.
 Verlaine and Cezanne (Верлен и Сезанн). , 24 June 1925. , No.13, 1925.
  (Нотр-Дам). , No. 1, 1925
  (Версаль). Krasnaya Nov, No. 1, 1925.
  (Жорес). , No. 2, 1925. Mayakovsky was in France in November 1924, when the French Socialist leader's ashes were moved to the Paris' Panthéon. The poem was inspired by this event. 
 . , 3 June 1925. Ogonyok, No 28, 1925.
 . , 3 June 1925

References

1925 books
Poetry by Vladimir Mayakovsky
Russian poetry collections